Stella Levy (1924 – 19 July 1999) was an Israeli soldier and politician.

Biography
Born in Syria in 1924, Levy made aliyah to Mandatory Palestine in 1929. She attended the Hebrew Reali School in Haifa, and later studied psychology at the University of Haifa and political science and art at Tel Aviv University.

Levy  joined the Haganah during her youth, and during World War II she served in the Communications Corps of the British Army between 1942 and 1946. After Israeli independence in 1948, she completed the first IDF officers' training  course, and commanded the Women's Corps platoon of the Carmel Brigade between 1948 and 1949. She completed a battalion commanders course in 1949, and in 1951 became head of the Women's Corps in the Northern Command. From 1964 until 1970, she served as commander of the Women's Corps. From 1970 until 1974, she worked as a military emissary to the United States, before being demobilised with the rank of colonel in 1974.

In 1974, she helped form the Civil Guard subdivision of Israel Police, and served in it until 1976. The following year she joined the Democratic Movement for Change. She was on the party's list for the 1977 Knesset elections, but failed to win a seat. She entered the Knesset on 20 February 1981 as a replacement for Stef Wertheimer, and chose to join the Shinui faction (the Democratic Movement of Change had split into several parties in 1978). However, she lost her seat in the June 1981 elections.

Outside politics Levy was also a member of the Zionist Executive Committee and on the board of the Israeli branch of the World Jewish Congress.

She died in July 1999.

References

External links

1924 births
1999 deaths
Jews in the French Mandate for Syria and the Lebanon
Syrian Jews
Syrian emigrants to Mandatory Palestine
Jews in Mandatory Palestine
Haganah members
British Army personnel of World War II
University of Haifa alumni
Tel Aviv University alumni
Israeli soldiers
Israeli police officers
Israeli people of Syrian-Jewish descent
Women members of the Knesset
Democratic Movement for Change politicians
Shinui politicians
Members of the 9th Knesset (1977–1981)
20th-century Israeli women politicians